The Saudi National Security Council (SNSC) was the body in charge of coordinating Saudi Arabia's national security, intelligence and foreign policy strategy. It was established in 2005 by King Abdullah bin Abdulaziz Al Saud. The first secretary general of the SNSC was Prince Bandar bin Sultan, the former Saudi Ambassador to the United States. The assistant secretary general of the SNSC was Prince Salman bin Sultan until 6 August 2013. The council was abolished by King Salman on 29 January 2015.

History
The National Security Council was formed on 16 October 2005 by the newly crowned King Abdullah in response to major geopolitical shifts in the Middle East region. The occupation of Iraq made the region "a center for reconstruction, globalization and reorganization" with the entry of the United States as a major player. In addition to its regional influence in the Arabian Peninsula, Saudi Arabia is one of the leading actors in the Islamic world and has a central role in global energy policy.

Role
The Council was formed to act as an organizational mechanism that coordinates the Kingdom's internal and external policies relating to national security, enabling it to respond effectively to rapidly changing domestic, regional and international environments. It had the power to declare war and investigate security agencies if they were involved in acts that threaten national security.

Despite the formation of the Council, as with other Saudi government institutions, major national security decisions would continue to be taken by the most senior members of the royal family.

Membership
The SNSC was chaired by the King (who is also Prime Minister), with the Crown Prince (who is also Deputy Prime Minister) as deputy chairman. Its affairs are coordinated by a permanent Secretary General. At the time of its formation, other members included the Minister of the Interior, Minister of Foreign Affairs, Deputy Commander of the Saudi Arabian National Guard and head of the General Intelligence Presidency. Late Prince Nayef, then interior minister, served as the deputy head of the SNSC.

Dissolution
King Salman dissolved the NSC on 29 January 2015.

References

2005 establishments in Saudi Arabia
2015 disestablishments in Saudi Arabia
Government agencies established in 2005
Government agencies disestablished in 2015
Foreign relations of Saudi Arabia
Government agencies of Saudi Arabia
Saudi Arabia
Former government agencies of Saudi Arabia